Consuelo Trujillo Urbano is a Spanish actress, acting teacher, and theater director.

Biography
Trujillo won the Actors Union Award for Best Supporting Actress in 2014 for the play Cuando deje de llover, and for Best Theatrical Actress in 2016 for Criatura. She has also appeared in productions such as Blood Wedding, Doña Rosita the Spinster, The House of Bernarda Alba, and Medea. In film she has had roles in The Bride, Al sur de Granada, Yo, también, and Verónica.

She is an acting teacher at the Juan Carlos Corazza academy and her classes have included students such as Javier Bardem and Elena Anaya.

She is the romantic partner of actress Susi Sánchez. The two met while appearing in Blood Wedding in 1986. They have been outspoken advocates of LGBT rights, acting in plays such as The Laramie Project and appearing at several gay pride events together.

References

External links
 

Year of birth missing (living people)
Living people
21st-century Spanish actresses
Acting teachers
Actresses from Andalusia
Spanish lesbian actresses
Spanish LGBT rights activists
People from La Línea de la Concepción
Spanish film actresses
Spanish stage actresses
Spanish theatre directors
Women theatre directors
21st-century Spanish LGBT people